Thomas Rolland Norris (born January 14, 1944) is a retired United States Navy SEAL and Distinguished Eagle Scout who received the Medal of Honor for his ground rescue with the assistance of Petty Officer Third Class Nguyen Van Kiet of two downed aircrew members in Quang Tri Province, Vietnam on April 10–13, 1972. At the time of the action, Lieutenant Norris was a SEAL Advisor with the Strategic Technical Directorate Assistance Team. Norris was one of three SEALs to receive the Medal of Honor for actions during the Vietnam War.

Early life
Thomas Norris was born on January 14, 1944, in Jacksonville, Florida. He grew up in Wisconsin and Washington, D.C. As a youth, he was a member of the Boy Scouts of America and attained the rank of Eagle Scout. Graduating from Montgomery Blair High School, he entered the University of Maryland in 1963, with the intent of pursuing a criminology career with the Federal Bureau of Investigation (FBI). He earned a Bachelor of Science degree in Sociology with a specialty in Criminology in 1967. While at university, he was an Atlantic Coast Conference wrestling champion in 1965 and 1966.

United States Navy
Norris enlisted in the United States Navy when his student deferment from the draft was not extended. He hoped to join the navy and fly jets, but he had problems with his visual acuity and depth perception that disqualified him from becoming a pilot. He then became a Navy SEAL. Norris struggled during BUD/S training, and the instructors considered removing him from the course. However, the instructors decided to allow Norris to try to finish the training, and he graduated from BUD/S class 45 in July 1969 at Naval Amphibious Base Little Creek. Norris completed his first tour of duty in South Vietnam with Fifth platoon, SEAL Team TWO from February to August 1970 earning Bronze Star Medal with combat "V" device.

Ground rescue operation

 
In April 1972, Norris was one of few remaining SEALs in Vietnam serving with MACVSOG Danang Naval Advisory Detachment. When Lieutenant Colonel Iceal Hambleton was shot down behind enemy lines, aerial combat search and rescue operations failed, leading to the loss of five additional aircraft and the death of 11 or more airmen, two captured, and three more down and needing rescue. Norris was tasked with mounting a ground operation to recover Hambleton, Lieutenant Mark Clark, and Lieutenant Bruce Walker from behind enemy lines. Assisted by Vietnamese Sea Commando forces, he and Republic of Vietnam Navy Petty Officer Nguyen Van Kiet went more than  behind enemy lines and successfully rescued two of the downed American aviators. Walker was discovered and killed by the North Vietnamese Army. Though Norris at first rejected the honor, he was recognized with the Medal of Honor in 1975.

Intelligence gathering mission
Six months later, on October 31, 1972, Norris and fellow Navy SEAL Michael E. Thornton accompanied three South Vietnamese special forces soldiers on an intelligence gathering operation south of the demilitarized zone. They intended to reconnoiter the area around the Cửa Việt Base near the coast of Quảng Trị Province, just south of the Demilitarized Zone. 

Approaching by sea, the group was transported by junk until sunset, then paddled a rubber boat to within a mile of shore and swam the remaining distance. Moving inland past numerous North Vietnamese encampments, the group reconnoitered through the night.

When morning dawned, the 5-man group realized that they had landed  to the north and were actually in North Vietnam. They soon encountered a two-man North Vietnamese patrol, which the South Vietnamese attempted to capture. Instead, enemy troops were alerted to their position. For the next four hours, the five men held off an enemy force estimated at about 200–300 strong. Norris called in naval firepower on the enemy's positions, helping to keep them alive. 

The North Vietnamese regrouped and surrounded the troops. The SEALs and South Vietnamese decided to withdraw. Norris protected their rear while the others moved towards the water. He was shot in the head and severely wounded. One of the South Vietnamese who saw Norris' wound assumed he was dead. Thornton, upon hearing the news, ran through heavy fire to recover the body of his fallen comrade, only to discover that Norris was still just barely alive. He killed several North Vietnamese as they surmounted the dunes around his position and then carried the unconscious Norris into the water. 

Thornton also carried one of the South Vietnamese soldiers who had been wounded and was unable to swim into the ocean. Thornton swam and supported the two injured men for more than two hours before they were picked up by the same junk that had dropped them off the night before. Norris' first surgery lasted 19 hours.

Thornton was recognized with the Medal of Honor for his actions by President Richard Nixon during a ceremony at the White House on October 15, 1973. He snuck Norris out of the hospital in the middle of the night so Norris could attend the ceremony. Norris was later awarded the Medal of Honor by President Gerald R. Ford in a White House ceremony on March 6, 1976. Thornton thus became the first Medal of Honor recipient recognized for saving the life of another Medal of Honor recipient. Norris lost an eye and part of his skull. He spent three years recovering from his injuries in the hospital and over a six-year period underwent many major surgeries. As a result of the head injury, he was medically retired from the navy in May 1975.

FBI
In 1979, Norris joined the Federal Bureau of Investigation (FBI) and requested a waiver for his disabilities. FBI director William Webster responded, "If you can pass the same test as anybody else applying for this organization, I will waive your disabilities." In September 1979, Norris passed the test and subsequently was an FBI Special Agent for 20 years. He was an original member of the FBI's Hostage Rescue Team as an assault team leader. He is a member of the Society of Former Special Agents of the Federal Bureau of Investigation.

Medal of Honor citation
Citation:

Honors and recognitions
The Naval Special Warfare Group Two in Little Creek, Virginia is located in the Lt. Thomas R. Norris Building.

Norris' Medal of Honor actions have been re-told in numerous books and in the feature film Bat*21, which was the call sign for an EB-66C from the 42nd Tactical Electronic Warfare Squadron (42 TEWS), 388th Tactical Fighter Wing, at Korat, Thailand. The aircraft was shot down while flying pathfinder escort for a cell of three B-52 bombing near the Demilitarized Zone.

Norris received the Distinguished Eagle Scout Award in 2011. He is one of eleven Eagle Scouts who received the Medal of Honor.

In 1976, he received the Golden Plate Award of the American Academy of Achievement.

Military awards
Norris' military decorations and awards include the following:

Bibliography
 Written with Mike Thornton and Dick Couch.

See also

 List of Medal of Honor recipients for the Vietnam War
 MACV-SOG
 List of Eagle Scouts

References

External links
 
 
 
 Lt. Thomas R. Norris, USN Biography and Interview on American Academy of Achievement
 
 
 

1944 births
Living people
Federal Bureau of Investigation agents
United States Navy Medal of Honor recipients
Recipients of the Silver Star
Recipients of the Gallantry Cross (Vietnam)
United States Navy SEALs personnel
United States Navy officers
United States Navy personnel of the Vietnam War
Vietnam War recipients of the Medal of Honor
University of Maryland, College Park alumni